Henry Waitt (died 1902) was an American businessman who co-founded Waitt & Bond with Charles Henry Bond.

Waitt was born in Malden, Massachusetts. He spent most of his life in the Franklin Park section (also known as North Revere) of Revere, Massachusetts. As a young man, Waitt became involved in the tobacco business.

In 1870, he and Bond established Waitt & Bond in a small shop in Saugus, Massachusetts. The business grew rapidly and it was relocated to a large factory in Boston. Waitt & Bond eventually became the largest cigar manufacturer in New England and one of the largest in the United States.

In 1898, Waitt moved to Newton, Massachusetts. He died on May 7, 1902 at his home after a long illness.

The city of Revere named the elementary school in Franklin Park after Waitt. The Henry Waitt School opened in 1910 and was sold to a private owner in 1980.

References

Year of birth missing
1902 deaths
American tobacco industry executives
People from Malden, Massachusetts
People from Newton, Massachusetts
People from Revere, Massachusetts